Hrytsak is a gender-neutral Ukrainian surname that may refer to:

Rob Hrytsak (born 1965), Canadian ice hockey player
Vasyl Hrytsak (born 1967), head of the Security Service of Ukraine
Yaroslav Hrytsak (born 1960), Ukrainian historian
, Ukrainian chess grandmaster

Ukrainian-language surnames